
Gmina Tychowo is an urban-rural gmina (administrative district) in Białogard County, West Pomeranian Voivodeship, in north-western Poland.

Before 1 January 2010, when Tychowo became a town, the district was classed as a rural gmina.

Villages
Apart from the town of Tychowo, the gmina contains the villages and settlements of Anin, Bąbnica, Borzysław, Borzysław-Kolonia, Buczki, Bukówko, Bukowo, Czarnkowo, Doble, Dobrochy, Dobrówko, Dobrowo, Drzonowo Białogardzkie, Dzięciołowo, Giżałki, Głuszyna, Kikowo, Kościanka, Kowalki, Krosinko, Liśnica, Modrolas, Motarzyn, Nowe Dębno, Osówko, Pobądz, Podborsko, Radzewo, Retowo, Rozłazino, Rudno, Sadkowo, Skarzewice, Sławomierz, Słonino, Smęcino, Solno, Stare Dębno, Trzebiec, Trzebiszyn, Tychówko, Tyczewo, Ujazd, Warnino, Wełdkówko, Wełdkowo, Wicewo, Zaspy Wielkie, Zastawa and Żukówek.

Neighbouring gminas
Gmina Tychowo is bordered by the gminas of Barwice, Białogard, Bobolice, Grzmiąca, Połczyn-Zdrój and Świeszyno.

References
Polish official population figures 2006

Tychowo
Białogard County